G. tricolor  may refer to:
 Gilia tricolor, the bird's-eye gilia, an annual plant species native to California
 Grotella tricolor, a moth species found in California and Arizona

See also
 Tricolor (disambiguation)